The Representation of the Faroes in Reykjavík is the official representative office of the Faroe Islands in Iceland. The Representation opened in 2007 after being established with the signing of the Hoyvík Free Trade Agreement in 2005.

Hoyvík Agreement
A free trade agreement between the Faroes and Iceland was signed on 31 August 2005 and was approved in parliament in April 2006. The agreement extends the scope of cooperation between the two countries to the free movement of all goods, services, capital and persons, in effect creating a Faroese - Icelandic common market.

See also

Faroe Islands
Politics of the Faroe Islands
List of diplomatic missions in Iceland
Danish Realm

External links
 Prime Minister’s Office

References

Foreign relations of the Faroe Islands
Denmark–Iceland relations
Diplomatic missions